Deb Stevens is a New Hampshire politician.

Career
On November 8, 2016, Stevens was elected to the New Hampshire House of Representatives where she represents the Hillsborough 34 district. She assumed office on December 5, 2018. She is a Democrat.

Personal life
Stevens resides in Nashua, New Hampshire.

References

Living people
Politicians from Nashua, New Hampshire
Women state legislators in New Hampshire
Democratic Party members of the New Hampshire House of Representatives
21st-century American politicians
21st-century American women politicians
Year of birth missing (living people)